2 Area Support Group Signal Squadron (2 ASG Sig Sqn) was a Regular Force Army unit within the Canadian Forces.  The squadron was responsible for delivering secure and non-secure communication and information systems across Land Force Central Area (LFCA).  The squadron's parent formation was 2 Area Support Group (2 ASG). Although an Army unit, for service delivery the squadron aligned itself to an ITIL framework for business processes and a common lexicon with industry partners.

2 ASG Signal Squadron was headquartered at Canadian Forces Base (CFB) Petawawa with platoon-sized troops in Petawawa, Kingston, Toronto, London and section-sized detachments in Ottawa, Sault Ste Marie, and North Bay.  The majority of soldiers within the squadron came from the Communications and Electronics Branch. In 2013, 2 ASG Sig Sqn was renamed 4th Canadian Division Support Group Signal Squadron.

History 
2 ASG Sig Sqn, in various forms, has been located at CFB Petawawa since a school of signals was established in 1912.  In 1960, Camp Petawawa Signal Squadron was formed from the amalgamation of three units: 2 Static Signal Troop, Camp Petawawa Signal Troop, and Increment D Troop.  On 1 November 1966, Camp Petawawa Signal Squadron became 702 Communication Squadron (702 Comm Sqn) with the motto Nunquam Non Paratus (Never Unready).

Over the years the squadron has changed hands between Army Signals, Communication Command, Director Information Services Organization and back to the Army.  In 1998, 702 Communications Squadron became part of 2 ASG within Land Force Central Area (LFCA) and renamed to 2 Area Support Group Signal Squadron.  Base Information Technology Support Units (BITSUs) at Ottawa, Kingston, Toronto, London, North Bay and Sault Ste. Marie were amalgamated with the squadron to create a single unit within LFCA, which would provide consolidated information systems support to all Army units in Ontario. In 2013, 2 ASG Sig Sqn was renamed 4th Canadian Division Support Group Signal Squadron with a Government of Canada move to restore historical features of the Canadian Army.

Commanding officers
 Lieutenant-Colonel Wayne Buck, CD, MSM (nato), 1998–2000
 Lieutenant-Colonel Paul Roy, CD, 2000–2002
 Major Luc Angiolini, CD, 2002–2004
 Major Ray Charlebois, CD, 2004–2006
 Major James Greengrass, CD, 2006–2008
 Major James Bronson, CD, 2008–2009
 Major Alex MacPherson, CD, 2009–2011
 Major Jason Smith, CD, 2011–2013

Squadron Sergeants Major 
 Master Warrant Officer Theresa Charlton, CD, 2001–2005
 Master Warrant Officer Don MacIsaac, CD, 2005–2007
 Master Warrant Officer Rob Sheldrick, CD, 2007–2008
 Master Warrant Officer Allan Montgomery, CD, 2008–2010
 Master Warrant Officer Stephen McNabb, MMM, CD, 2010–2011
 Master Warrant Officer Al Trask, CD, 2011–2013

Armoury

See also

 List of armouries in Canada
 Military history of Canada
 History of the Canadian Army
 Canadian Forces
 2 CMBG Headquarters & Signal Squadron

References

Military communications squadrons of Canada